The Puracé National Natural Park is a national park located in the Andean Region of Colombia, southeast of the city of Popayán in the Cordillera Central range. Its main feature is the active stratovolcano Puracé, one of Colombia's most active volcanoes. Four of the country's most important rivers originate within the area: Magdalena River, Cauca River, Japurá River and Patía River.

General
It was established in 1961 as the first national park in the Cauca Department. During the 1990s the FARC guerrilla used the park as a base camp, but has since waned as a result of the 2002 military campaign against the movement enacted by President of Colombia Álvaro Uribe.

The way to get to the park is through Popayán, capital of the Department of Cauca, which can be reached by the Pan-American highway that connects the country from north to south. Then take the road to the town of Puracé, located at the foot of the volcano. It is 44 km long and takes about an hour. The road is in good condition. From Puracé you continue to a point called "El Crucero", and then - 1 km further - to the beautiful recreational area of Pilimbalá, in the northern sector of the volcano. Or the park can also be reached from the old Colombian police base located at 4000 meters above sea level which can be accessed by vehicle after passing through the Puracé's sulphur mines.

Starting from Pilimabalá at a medium pace and with good weather, it can take 3 ½ h to ascend to the crater. If the ascent is made via the military base the journey is much shorter and may take around 1 ½ to 2 h.

Climate 
Frost occurs frequently above  and almost daily above .

Flora and fauna
Over 200 orchids and nationally threatened species such as the Colombian Pine, Andean Oak, Wax palm tree are found in the park. It is home to over 160 species of birds, of which hummingbirds, ducks, birds of prey are the most dominating. Several mammals are found in the park: spectacled bear, mountain tapir, cougar, pudú as well as the Andean condor that the San Diego Zoo helped to reintroduce in the 1990s. The lower elevation forests are home to four primates: woolly monkey, howler monkey, gray-bellied night monkey, tufted capuchin.

Gallery

Communities 
The park's area serves as an indigenous reservation for the Cocunuco ethnic group, in the Pilimbalá sector, where the same community offers comfortable lodging and typical food. There is also an indigenous Guambiano settlement.

Footnotes

References

External links

The park's page at Parques Nacionales Naturales de Colombia 
Observatorio Vulcanológico y Sismológico de Popayán
Information about Puracé in the Global Volcanism Program

National parks of Colombia
Protected areas established in 1961
Geography of Cauca Department
1961 establishments in Colombia
Tourist attractions in Cauca Department
Páramos
Northwestern Andean montane forests